Christopher C. French is a United States Navy rear admiral who serves as the Deputy Judge Advocate General of the Navy since August 18, 2021. A career judge advocate, French was commissioned into the Navy via the JAG Corps Student Program in 1992, graduating from the University of New Hampshire in 1990, the Villanova University School of Law in 1993 and from the Georgetown University Law Center with an L.L.M. degree in 2004.

Early life and education 
French was born in Albany, New York. He graduated from the University of New Hampshire in 1990. French was commissioned through the Judge Advocate General's Corps Student Program in 1992, graduating in 1993 from the Villanova University School of Law. He later earned a Master of Laws from Georgetown University Law Center in 2004.

Naval and JAG Career 
At sea, French served as the fleet judge advocate to Commander, U.S. Seventh Fleet; staff judge advocate to Commander, Carrier Strike Group FIVE; and legal officer, aboard USS Nimitz (CVN-68).

His other assignments include legal counsel, Chairman of the Joint Chiefs of Staff; staff judge advocate, U.S. European Command; deputy legal advisor to the U.S. National Security Council; special counsel to the Chief of Naval Operations; commanding officer, U.S. Region Legal Service Office, Europe, Africa, and Southwest Asia; chief of Operational Law, Multi-National Forces, Iraq; deputy legal counsel, Office of the Legal Counsel to the Chairman of the Joint Chiefs of Staff; assistant force judge advocate, Commander, U.S. Naval Forces, Europe; staff judge advocate, Naval Special Warfare Development Group. French began his legal career first as a trial counsel and later as the senior defense counsel at Naval Legal Service Office, Middle Pacific, Pearl Harbor, Hawaii.

He was promoted to rear admiral (lower half) on July 31, 2018, and rear admiral on August 1, 2021.

Awards and decorations

Effective dates of promotions

References

Date of birth missing (living people)
Year of birth missing (living people)
Living people
People from Albany, New York
People from Brooklyn
Military personnel from New York (state)
20th-century American lawyers
21st-century American lawyers
Lawyers from Albany, New York
United States Navy rear admirals (upper half)
University of New Hampshire alumni
Villanova University School of Law alumni
Georgetown University Law Center
Recipients of the Defense Superior Service Medal
Recipients of the Legion of Merit